Bark is the third album by Blackie and the Rodeo Kings, released by True North Records on July 7, 2003.

Critical reception

Thom Jurek of AllMusic concludes his review with, "Produced by Linden, Bark is the garage band record of the year so far and reveals a band coming into its own with authority, reckless abandon, and a wicked rock & roll grin."

No Depression writes in their review, "The group’s third album, Bark, also owes much to the chops of three frontmen: Colin Linden, with the reedy voice of an openly passionate Lyle Lovett; Tom Wilson, whose nicotine baritone roughs up everything it touches; and Stephen Fearing, straight-ahead in vocal style and languidly soulful in delivery."

Track listing

Musicians

Stephen Fearing – Acoustic Guitar (tracks: 1, 3, 6, 8, 10, 12), Electric Guitar (tracks: 1, 2, 4, 5, 7, 9, 11, 13, 14), Harmony Vocals (tracks 1, 2, 7, 9, 11), Lead Vocals (tracks 2, 7, 10, 13), High String Guitar (track 2)
Tom Wilson – Acoustic Guitar (tracks 1, 3 to 14), Backing Vocals – (tracks 3, 7, 8), Lead Vocals (tracks 1, 4, 6, 9, 11, 14)
John Dymond – Bass
Colin Linden – Electric Dobro (tracks 3, 4, 12), Electric Guitar (tracks 1, 2, 5 to 11, 13, 14), Harmony Vocals (tracks 1, 2, 7, 9, 11), Lead Vocals (tracks 5, 8, 12), Mandoguitar (track 2), Resonator (track 6)
Gary Craig – Drums
Richard Bell – Organ (tracks 2, 4, 5, 7 to 12, 14), Piano (tracks 1, 3, 6, 13)
Bryan Owings – Percussion (tracks 3, 4, 9)
Janice Powers – Keyboard (track 4)
John Whynot – Piano (track 12)
Sue Foley – Background Vocals (track 13)

Production
Producer – Colin Linden
Recorded By – John Whynot
Additional Recording – Colin Linden
Recording Assistant – Barry Mcclellan
Recording Assistant – Gene Foster
Recording Assistant – Jeff Elliott
Bark Symbol Artwork – Tom Wilson
Design, Layout, Crown Nightlight Photo – Michael Wrycraft
Mixed By – Colin Linden (tracks: 5, 7, 8, 13)
Mixed By – John Whynot (tracks: 1 to 4, 6, 9 to 12, 14)
Photography By – Bob Lanois

Track information and credits adapted from the album's liner notes.

References

External links
Blackie and the Rodeo Kings Official Site
True North Records Official Site

2003 albums
Blackie and the Rodeo Kings albums
True North Records albums